Mr. Pellikoduku is a 2013 Telugu-language film directed by Devi Prasad, starring Sunil and Isha Chawla. This movie was produced by N. V. Prasad and Paras Jain under the Megaa Super Good Films Banner, while S. A. Rajkumar scored the music. This film is an official remake of 2011 Hindi film Tanu Weds Manu, directed by Anand L. Rai, starring R. Madhavan and Kangana Ranaut in the lead roles. The film released on 1 March 2013.

Cast

 Sunil as Buchi Babu
 Isha Chawla as Anjali
 Khaleel as Raja
 Ali as Bachi; Buchi Babu's friend
 Dharmavarapu Subramanyam as B. Parabramham; Buchi Babu's father
 L. B. Sriram as Raja's father
 Ahuti Prasad as Veerraju; Anjali's father
 Ravi Babu as Raja's right-hand
 M. S. Narayana as A visitor to Buchi Babu's friend's wedding
 Tulasi Shivamani as Buchi Babu's mother
 Usha Sri as Anjali's mother
 Giridhar as A visitor to Buchi Babu's friend's wedding
 Vishnupriya as Chaya; Bachi's love interest

Reception
Mr. Pellikoduku opened to mixed reviews from the critics. The Hindu gave a review stating "Mr. Pellikoduku is a hotchpotch remake. Re-visit Tanu Weds Manu instead." IBN Live gave a review stating "Mr Pellikoduku, the remake of 'Tanu weds Manu' fails to recreate the magic." The Times of India gave a review stating "Forget Tanu Weds Manu was ever made and you might be able to see the funny side of it all." Sify.com gave a review stating the movie to be a "unsatisfying remake".

Rediff.com gave a review of rating 2/5 stating "Mr Pellikoduku has all the badly written additions woven into it. The music isn't appealing either. The Telugu version sadly fails and scores on no account." Oneindia Entertainment gave a review of rating 2.5/5 stating "Overall, Mr Pellikoduku is a poor remake of Tanu Weds Manu, but you can still watch and enjoy it." APHerald.com gave a review of rating 2/5 stating "With unimpressive technical team, poor efforts by lead pair Mr. Pellikoduku killed the natural & fresh feel which 'Tanu Weds Manu' had in it. It's better to buy 'Tanu Weds Manu' DVD than buying Mr. Pellikoduku ticket."

Soundtrack

The audio release function was held at Shilpakala Vedika, Hyderabad on 2 February 2013.

References

2013 films
Telugu remakes of Hindi films
Indian comedy films
2010s Telugu-language films
Super Good Films films